Toivo Tulev (born 18 July 1958) is an Estonian composer.

Works

 "Hommage to the Setting Sun" (for chamber ensemble; 1993)
 "Quella Sera" (for chamber orchestra; 1996)
 "Opus 21" (for chamber orchestra; 1996)
 "Don’t Call Him Too Early" (2002)
 ballett "Cruz" (2002)
 "Swing Low" (2003)
 "Future Continuous" (for symphony orchestra; 2008)

References

Living people
1958 births
Estonian composers